Antonio Herrera Cerilles (born October 7, 1948) is a former Governor of Zamboanga del Sur, Philippines, from June 30, 2010, until June 30, 2019. He ran and lost during the 2019 elections for Representative of the 2nd Legislative District of Zamboanga del Sur to Bayog Mayor Leonardo L. Babasa, Jr.

Prior to the governorship, he was a member of the House of Representatives of the Philippines as the representative of the second district of Zamboanga del Sur. He has been succeeded in the Congress by his wife, Aurora Enerio-Cerilles as congressman who also preceded him in the governorship of the province. He also served as the Secretary of Department of Environment and Natural Resources during the tenure of then Philippine President Joseph Estrada from 1998 to 2001.

Early life
Cerilles was born on October 7, 1948 in Manila to Vicente Cerilles and Josefina Herrera. He earned his Bachelor of Arts degree in Political Science from University of Santo Tomas in 1968 and his Bachelor of Laws degree from University of the East in 1972.

Membership
He is an active member of Alpha Phi Omega fraternity. He was the National President of JCI Senate Philippines 2012. He is also the National Senior Vice President of the Boy Scouts of the Philippines and the current Council Chairman of BSP Zamboanga del Sur-Pagadian City Council. He is also a member of various organizations including the Knights of Columbus, Council 8188 and the Parliamentary Government Foundation.

Career in the House of Representatives
Before being elected as a congressman, Cerilles was elected as a Regional Assemblyman of the Sanguniang Pampook of Region X, Zamboanga City from 1982–1987. He was elected as the representative of the second district of Zamboanga del Sur in 1987, 1992 and 1995. Among the laws he authored during this stint was House Bill No. 3950 now Republic Act No. 6975 otherwise known as the "Department of the Interior and Local Government Act of 1990," which established the Philippine National Police under a Reorganized Department of the Interior and Local Government and House Bill No. 9347 now Republic Act No. 8047 otherwise known as the "Book Publishing Industry Development Act," which formulated and implemented a National Book Policy and a National Book Development Plan. After serving as DENR Secretary from 1998–2001, he was elected again as a representative in 2004. He was one of the signatories of House Resolution 1109 calling for a constituent assembly to amend the Constitution.

Honors
A classroom inside Dalupan Building in University of the East in Manila was renamed Secretary Antonio H. Cerilles Chamber being an alumnus of the UE College of Law.

References

|-

|-

|-

|-

Living people
Governors of Zamboanga del Sur
Lakas–CMD politicians
1948 births
20th-century Filipino lawyers
People from Manila
University of Santo Tomas alumni
University of the East alumni
Members of the House of Representatives of the Philippines from Zamboanga del Sur
Secretaries of Environment and Natural Resources of the Philippines
Estrada administration cabinet members